EDAS was a database of alternatively spliced human genes. It doesn't seem to exist anymore.

See also
AspicDB database

References

External links
 http://www.gene-bee.msu.ru/edas/.

Genetics databases
Gene expression
Spliceosome
RNA splicing